Naseer Ahmad Khan is an Indian politician and social worker. He is a member of the 18th Legislative Assembly of Uttar Pradesh, representing the Chamraua Assembly constituency of Uttar Pradesh. He is a member of the Samajwadi Party, a socialist political party in India.

Early life 

Naseer Ahmad Khan was born on 8 July 1938 in Rampur, Uttar Pradesh, India. His father, Mohammad Shah Khan, was a farmer. He grew up in Uttar Pradesh and post-graduated with a Master of Arts from Mahatma Jyotiba Phule Rohilkhand University, Bareilly, Uttar Pradesh, India.

Political career 

In the 2022 Uttar Pradesh Legislative Assembly election, Khan represented Samajwadi Party as a candidate from the Chamraua Assembly constituency and defeated Mohan Kumar Lodhi of the Bharatiya Janata Party by a margin of 34290 votes.

Posts held

See also 

 18th Uttar Pradesh Assembly
 Chamraua Assembly constituency
 Uttar Pradesh Legislative Assembly

References 

1938 births
Living people
Indian Muslims
People from Uttar Pradesh
Indian political people
Uttar Pradesh MLAs 2022–2027
Indian politicians
People from Rampur district